Mona language may refer to:

Mwan language (Mwana), Ivory Coast
Bwilim language (Mwano), Nigeria